The 1990–91 New York Rangers season was the franchise's 65th season. During the regular season, the Rangers were 36–31–13 and finished in second place in the Patrick Division, qualifying for the playoffs. In the division semi-finals, New York lost in six games to the Washington Capitals.

Regular season

The Rangers' 91 power-play goals scored during the regular season were good enough for first place in the league, tied with the Calgary Flames. The Rangers finished second overall in power-play percentage, with 23.39% (91 for 389).

Final standings

Schedule and results

|- align="center" bgcolor="#FFBBBB"
| 1 || 4 || @ Chicago Blackhawks || 4 - 3 || 0-1-0
|- align="center" bgcolor="#FFBBBB"
| 2 || 6 || @ Hartford Whalers || 5 - 4 || 0-2-0
|- align="center" bgcolor="#CCFFCC"
| 3 || 8 || Minnesota North Stars || 6 - 3 || 1-2-0
|- align="center" bgcolor="#CCFFCC"
| 4 || 10 || Washington Capitals || 4 - 2 || 2-2-0
|- align="center" bgcolor="#CCFFCC"
| 5 || 12 || Montreal Canadiens || 3 - 0 || 3-2-0
|- align="center" bgcolor="#CCFFCC"
| 6 || 13 || @ Washington Capitals || 5 - 2 || 4-2-0
|- align="center" bgcolor="#CCFFCC"
| 7 || 17 || Winnipeg Jets || 5 - 3 || 5-2-0
|- align="center" bgcolor="#FFBBBB"
| 8 || 19 || @ New Jersey Devils || 3 - 2 || 5-3-0
|- align="center" bgcolor="#CCFFCC"
| 9 || 20 || @ Pittsburgh Penguins || 4 - 3 || 6-3-0
|- align="center" bgcolor="#CCFFCC"
| 10 || 22 || Toronto Maple Leafs || 5 - 1 || 7-3-0
|- align="center" bgcolor="#CCFFCC"
| 11 || 25 || Philadelphia Flyers || 5 - 3 || 8-3-0
|- align="center" bgcolor="#CCFFCC"
| 12 || 27 || @ Quebec Nordiques || 4 - 1 || 9-3-0
|- align="center" bgcolor="#CCFFCC"
| 13 || 29 || Quebec Nordiques || 5 - 0 || 10-3-0
|- align="center" bgcolor="#CCFFCC"
| 14 || 31 || Los Angeles Kings || 9 - 4 || 11-3-0
|-

|- align="center" bgcolor="#FFBBBB"
| 15 || 2 || New York Islanders || 3 - 2 || 11-4-0
|- align="center" bgcolor="#FFBBBB"
| 16 || 3 || @ Pittsburgh Penguins || 3 - 1 || 11-5-0
|- align="center" bgcolor="#FFBBBB"
| 17 || 5 || Boston Bruins || 3 - 2 OT || 11-6-0
|- align="center" bgcolor="#CCFFCC"
| 18 || 7 || Buffalo Sabres || 6 - 2 || 12-6-0
|- align="center" bgcolor="#CCFFCC"
| 19 || 9 || @ New Jersey Devils || 3 - 2 || 13-6-0
|- align="center" bgcolor="white"
| 20 || 11 || Calgary Flames || 4 - 4 OT || 13-6-1
|- align="center" bgcolor="white"
| 21 || 13 || @ Philadelphia Flyers || 1 - 1 OT || 13-6-2
|- align="center" bgcolor="#CCFFCC"
| 22 || 15 || @ Minnesota North Stars || 4 - 2 || 14-6-2
|- align="center" bgcolor="#CCFFCC"
| 23 || 16 || @ Winnipeg Jets || 6 - 4 || 15-6-2
|- align="center" bgcolor="white"
| 24 || 19 || Minnesota North Stars || 2 - 2 OT || 15-6-3
|- align="center" bgcolor="white"
| 25 || 21 || @ Buffalo Sabres || 5 - 5 OT || 15-6-4
|- align="center" bgcolor="white"
| 26 || 24 || @ New York Islanders || 2 - 2 OT || 15-6-5
|- align="center" bgcolor="#CCFFCC"
| 27 || 26 || Buffalo Sabres || 5 - 0 || 16-6-5
|- align="center" bgcolor="#FFBBBB"
| 28 || 28 || Washington Capitals || 6 - 3 || 16-7-5
|- align="center" bgcolor="#FFBBBB"
| 29 || 30 || @ Philadelphia Flyers || 5 - 1 || 16-8-5
|-

|- align="center" bgcolor="#CCFFCC"
| 30 || 1 || @ Boston Bruins || 5 - 4 || 17-8-5
|- align="center" bgcolor="#FFBBBB"
| 31 || 3 || Pittsburgh Penguins || 9 - 4 || 17-9-5
|- align="center" bgcolor="#FFBBBB"
| 32 || 5 || @ Calgary Flames || 4 - 1 || 17-10-5
|- align="center" bgcolor="#FFBBBB"
| 33 || 7 || @ Edmonton Oilers || 4 - 3 || 17-11-5
|- align="center" bgcolor="#CCFFCC"
| 34 || 11 || @ Los Angeles Kings || 6 - 4 || 18-11-5
|- align="center" bgcolor="#CCFFCC"
| 35 || 14 || @ Vancouver Canucks || 5 - 3 || 19-11-5
|- align="center" bgcolor="#CCFFCC"
| 36 || 17 || Washington Capitals || 5 - 3 || 20-11-5
|- align="center" bgcolor="#FFBBBB"
| 37 || 19 || Toronto Maple Leafs || 4 - 1 || 20-12-5
|- align="center" bgcolor="#FFBBBB"
| 38 || 22 || @ Montreal Canadiens || 3 - 1 || 20-13-5
|- align="center" bgcolor="white"
| 39 || 23 || Boston Bruins || 5 - 5 OT || 20-13-6
|- align="center" bgcolor="#CCFFCC"
| 40 || 28 || @ Washington Capitals || 5 - 3 || 21-13-6
|- align="center" bgcolor="white"
| 41 || 30 || New Jersey Devils || 2 - 2 OT || 21-13-7
|-

|- align="center" bgcolor="#CCFFCC"
| 42 || 2 || Los Angeles Kings || 4 - 1 || 22-13-7
|- align="center" bgcolor="#CCFFCC"
| 43 || 3 || @ Pittsburgh Penguins || 7 - 5 || 23-13-7
|- align="center" bgcolor="#CCFFCC"
| 44 || 5 || @ St. Louis Blues || 3 - 2 OT || 24-13-7
|- align="center" bgcolor="#CCFFCC"
| 45 || 7 || Philadelphia Flyers || 3 - 2 || 25-13-7
|- align="center" bgcolor="#FFBBBB"
| 46 || 9 || St. Louis Blues || 3 - 2 || 25-14-7
|- align="center" bgcolor="#FFBBBB"
| 47 || 11 || @ Detroit Red Wings || 6 - 3 || 25-15-7
|- align="center" bgcolor="#CCFFCC"
| 48 || 13 || Hartford Whalers || 4 - 3 || 26-15-7
|- align="center" bgcolor="white"
| 49 || 15 || Edmonton Oilers || 2 - 2 OT || 26-15-8
|- align="center" bgcolor="#FFBBBB"
| 50 || 17 || Chicago Blackhawks || 3 - 2 || 26-16-8
|- align="center" bgcolor="#FFBBBB"
| 51 || 22 || @ New York Islanders || 3 - 2 || 26-17-8
|- align="center" bgcolor="#CCFFCC"
| 52 || 25 || @ Edmonton Oilers || 4 - 3 || 27-17-8
|- align="center" bgcolor="#FFBBBB"
| 53 || 30 || @ Calgary Flames || 5 - 1 || 27-18-8
|- align="center" bgcolor="white"
| 54 || 31 || @ Vancouver Canucks || 3 - 3 OT || 27-18-9
|-

|- align="center" bgcolor="#FFBBBB"
| 55 || 3 || Winnipeg Jets || 4 - 3 || 27-19-9
|- align="center" bgcolor="#CCFFCC"
| 56 || 6 || New York Islanders || 5 - 2 || 28-19-9
|- align="center" bgcolor="#CCFFCC"
| 57 || 8 || Vancouver Canucks || 8 - 1 || 29-19-9
|- align="center" bgcolor="#FFBBBB"
| 58 || 9 || @ Montreal Canadiens || 6 - 4 || 29-20-9
|- align="center" bgcolor="#CCFFCC"
| 59 || 13 || New Jersey Devils || 6 - 3 || 30-20-9
|- align="center" bgcolor="#CCFFCC"
| 60 || 15 || Hartford Whalers || 5 - 3 || 31-20-9
|- align="center" bgcolor="#FFBBBB"
| 61 || 18 || New York Islanders || 5 - 4 || 31-21-9
|- align="center" bgcolor="white"
| 62 || 21 || @ Philadelphia Flyers || 4 - 4 OT || 31-21-10
|- align="center" bgcolor="#FFBBBB"
| 63 || 22 || @ Washington Capitals || 3 - 2 || 31-22-10
|- align="center" bgcolor="#CCFFCC"
| 64 || 24 || New Jersey Devils || 5 - 2 || 32-22-10
|- align="center" bgcolor="white"
| 65 || 27 || Washington Capitals || 4 - 4 OT || 32-22-11
|- align="center" bgcolor="white"
| 66 || 28 || @ St. Louis Blues || 4 - 4 OT || 32-22-12
|-

|- align="center" bgcolor="#CCFFCC"
| 67 || 2 || @ Toronto Maple Leafs || 5 - 2 || 33-22-12
|- align="center" bgcolor="#CCFFCC"
| 68 || 4 || Philadelphia Flyers || 6 - 2 || 34-22-12
|- align="center" bgcolor="#FFBBBB"
| 69 || 7 || @ Quebec Nordiques || 4 - 2 || 34-23-12
|- align="center" bgcolor="#FFBBBB"
| 70 || 9 || @ New York Islanders || 6 - 4 || 34-24-12
|- align="center" bgcolor="#FFBBBB"
| 71 || 10 || @ Chicago Blackhawks || 5 - 2 || 34-25-12
|- align="center" bgcolor="#FFBBBB"
| 72 || 13 || Detroit Red Wings || 4 - 1 || 34-26-12
|- align="center" bgcolor="#FFBBBB"
| 73 || 15 || @ New Jersey Devils || 5 - 2 || 34-27-12
|- align="center" bgcolor="#FFBBBB"
| 74 || 17 || Pittsburgh Penguins || 4 - 2 || 34-28-12
|- align="center" bgcolor="#FFBBBB"
| 75 || 21 || @ Pittsburgh Penguins || 5 - 4 OT || 34-29-12
|- align="center" bgcolor="#FFBBBB"
| 76 || 23 || @ Philadelphia Flyers || 7 - 4 || 34-30-12
|- align="center" bgcolor="#CCFFCC"
| 77 || 24 || New York Islanders || 3 - 1 || 35-30-12
|- align="center" bgcolor="white"
| 78 || 26 || New Jersey Devils || 3 - 3 OT || 35-30-13
|- align="center" bgcolor="#FFBBBB"
| 79 || 30 || @ Detroit Red Wings || 6 - 5 || 35-31-13
|- align="center" bgcolor="#CCFFCC"
| 80 || 31 || Pittsburgh Penguins || 6 - 3 || 36-31-13
|-

Playoffs

Key:  Win  Loss

Player statistics
Skaters

Goaltenders

†Denotes player spent time with another team before joining Rangers. Stats reflect time with Rangers only.
‡Traded mid-season. Stats reflect time with Rangers only.

Draft picks
New York's picks at the 1990 NHL Entry Draft in Vancouver, British Columbia, Canada at the BC Place Stadium.

Supplemental Draft
New York's picks at the 1990 NHL Supplemental Draft.

See also
1990–91 NHL season

References

New York Rangers seasons
New York Rangers
New York Rangers
New York Rangers
New York Rangers
1990s in Manhattan
Madison Square Garden